Marvin Sigurd "Tommy Gun" Tommervik (April 23, 1919 – November 14, 2002) was an American football player and coach. He served as the head football coach at Pacific Lutheran University from 1947 to 1950, compiling a record of 19–10–6. Tommervik was drafted by the Philadelphia Eagles in 1942, but instead served for three years in the United States Navy during World War II. He played professionally for one year for the Tacoma Indians of the Pacific Coast Football League.

Head coaching record

Football

References

1919 births
2002 deaths
American football fullbacks
Pacific Lutheran Lutes baseball coaches
Pacific Lutheran Lutes football coaches
Pacific Lutheran Lutes football players
United States Navy personnel of World War II